Popular history is a broad genre of historiography that takes a popular approach, aims at a wide readership, and usually emphasizes narrative, personality and vivid detail over scholarly analysis. The term is used in contradistinction to professional academic or scholarly history writing which is usually more specialized and technical and thus less accessible to the general reader.

Conceptualizations 
It is proposed that popular history is a "moral science" in the sense that recreates the past not only for its own sake but also to underscore how history could facilitate an ethically responsible present. Some view it as history produced by authors who are better interlocutors capable of translating the language of scientificity to ordinary everyday language.

Some scholars partly attributed the development of popular history to the increase of writers-turned-historians such as Benson Lossing, David Pae, and Mary Botham Howitt, who wrote historical events "in good style" and, thus, more appealing to the public.

Popular historians 
Some popular historians are without academic affiliation while others are academics, or former academics, who have (according to one writer) "become somehow abstracted from the academic arena, becoming cultural commentators." Many worked as journalists, perhaps after taking an initial degree in history. Popular historians may become nationally renowned or best-selling authors and may or may not serve the interests of particular political viewpoints in their roles as "public historians". Many authors of "official histories" and "authorized biographies" would qualify as popular historians serving the interests of particular institutions or public figures.

Popular historians aim to appear on the "general lists" of general publishers, rather than the university presses that have dominated academic publishing in recent years. Increasingly, popular historians have taken to television where they are able, often accompanying a series of documentaries with a tie-in book.

Examples

Academics 
Recent examples of American popular historians with academic affiliations include Daniel J. Boorstin, Stephen E. Ambrose, Doris Kearns Goodwin and Pauline Maier. 

Recent examples of British popular historians who are also academics include Niall Ferguson, Mary Beard, Christopher Hibbert, Tom Holland, Simon Sebag Montefiore and Simon Schama, and – from a previous generation – Eric Hobsbawm, Paul Johnson, E. P. Thompson, A. J. P. Taylor (a pioneer of history on television) and Christopher Hill. Much of Hugh Trevor-Roper's output was also directed at a popular audience. There is also Stella Tillyard and her work Aristocrats, which combined scholarly research with the popular method of presentation.

Canadian academics whose work has crossed over to public consciousness are few.  Examples might include Michael Bliss, Donald Creighton, Desmond Morton, J. L. Granatstein, or Margaret MacMillan.  In French Canada the influence of Father Lionel Groulx in the historical thought of the twentieth century was preponderant.

Non academics 
American non-academics include Walter Lord, Bruce Catton, Shelby Foote, David McCullough, Max Cutler, Ron Cutler, and Barbara W. Tuchman. More podcasting has become a new medium in popular history where the contributions of Americans Dan Carlin and Robert Evans are notable.

John Julius Norwich, Charles Allen, and Tariq Ali are popular British historians who have never been academics.

English-Canadian writers of popular histories include journalists Pierre Berton and Peter C. Newman, humourist Will Ferguson, folklorist and pulp fiction writer Thomas P. Kelley, and television presenter Patrick Watson.  François-Xavier Garneau was the leading historian in nineteenth century French Canada from outside the academy.  Polemicists in the national unity debate have also written influentially about Canadian history, notably militant Pierre Vallières and journalist Normand Lester critiquing the Canadian state and novelist Mordecai Richler critiquing Quebec nationalist historians as anti-Semitic.  Notably, Canada has produced several writers who have written popular histories of specific ethnic communities, including Ken McGoogan (Scots and Irish), Myrna Kostash (Ukrainians), etc.

See also
 Public history
 Academic history
 History magazines
 List of history podcasts
 Narrative history
 Official history
 Popular science
 Whig history

References

Further reading
Wilentz, Sean, "America Made Easy: David McCullough, John Adams, and the Decline of Popular History, The New Republic, 2 July 2001.
Lepore, Jill, "Historians Who Love Too Much: Reflections on Microhistory and Biography", Journal of American History, 88 (June 2001): 129–44.
Pfitzer, Gregory M. (2008), Popular History and the Literary Marketplace, 1840-1920, Amherst: University of Massachusetts Press.

Genres
Historiography
History education
Literature
Non-fiction genres
History
Works about history